Alberto Caroly Abarza Díaz (born 11 December 1984) is a Chilean Paralympic swimmer who competes in international elite events. He is a triple Parapan American Games champion and a four-time World bronze medalist.

Career
Abarza has won the Para Athlete of the Year awards twice in 2018 and 2019 after winning medals in his international swimming competitions.

Personal life
Abarza was born with Charcot-Marie-Tooth syndrome, a neurodegenerative disease which causes progressive loss of muscular tissue.

References

1984 births
Living people
Paralympic swimmers of Chile
Swimmers at the 2016 Summer Paralympics
Swimmers at the 2020 Summer Paralympics
Medalists at the World Para Swimming Championships
Medalists at the 2019 Parapan American Games
Medalists at the 2020 Summer Paralympics
Paralympic gold medalists for Chile
Paralympic silver medalists for Chile
Paralympic medalists in swimming
Chilean male freestyle swimmers
Chilean male backstroke swimmers
S2-classified Paralympic swimmers
People from Maipo Province
21st-century Chilean people